Fabian Oefner (born 1984, Switzerland) creates colorful art by harnessing scientific properties in an effort to bring to attention the beauty of the natural world and how it works. His works have been displayed in various countries around the globe.

At a young age, Oefner has already had the prestige of speaking at a TEDx event. "Liquid Jewls" was featured in The Boston Globe, Wired UK and Wired in the US, and along with "Black Hole" in Stern (Germany's biggest weekly news magazine).

He has had exhibits in Zurich, Switzerland, Paris, France, Copenhagen, Denmark, Germany, and Poland. His works are widely recognizable by their color and composition and have been used by Asics shoe brand for promotion in +81 Magazine.

References

1984 births
Living people
Swiss artists